Bay Beach is a municipal amusement park in Green Bay, Wisconsin. Situated near the mouth of the Fox River, on the east bank as it flows into Green Bay, the park contains rides, concessions, a roller coaster, and a food pavilion. Dances, movies, and other events are held in a pavilion. The park is adjacent to the Bay Beach Wildlife Sanctuary.

History 
The park's history dates to the 1890s when entrepreneur Mitchell Nejedlo purchased the land. Originally intended to be divided and sold for summer cottages, he turned it into Bay View Beach. Bay View Beach had a dance hall, a bar, and a bathhouse, however, because it was swampy and infested with mosquitoes, the park didn't attract many visitors. In 1908 Captain John Cusick bought the resort from Nejedlo. Cusick built an 8-foot dock that extended 570 feet into the bay, then bought a steamboat to transport customers from Walnut Street Bridge to Bay View Beach. When swimming became popular, Cusick began renting swimsuits for $0.10. On a good day, he could bring in as much as $450. In 1901 a roller coaster was built. Then in 1908, Cusick built a ride called "Shoot the Chutes", a flat-bottomed boat that could hold 12 people. The boat was slid down a 50-foot ramp and onto the water. The ride cost $0.10.

In 1911 Bay View Beach was sold to Frank Emery Murphy, born 1862 (Green Bay Alderman, corporate executive of Murphy Lumber, Murphy Supply, Morley - Murphy Company, and owner of the prestigious Horse Shoe Bay Farms in Door County, Wisconsin) and Fred A. Rahr born 1863, (Green Bay Alderman, operator of Rahr's Brewing Company, Treasurer of the Green Bay Volunteer Fire Department when it was organized in 1887). In 1920 they donated the 11 acres, along with all its buildings and attractions, to the city of Green Bay to be  used as a City Park, Called Bay Beach Park.

From the site's earliest days as a private park, a public beach was available, but pollution of the bay eventually caused the swimming beach to close. From the 1930s to the early 1970s, Bay Beach's pavilion hosted concerts, political rallies, dances, Fourth of July fireworks, and other events. On August 9, 1934, President Franklin D. Roosevelt visited Bay Beach in celebration of Green Bay's tercentennial of the landing of French explorer Jean Nicolet in 1634.

Today the park is a family place, with scenic views and rides for children, including bumper cars, two small-scale passenger train rides, a large slide, and a Ferris wheel.

Upgrades 

In 2006,  of land west of the Bay Beach boundary was purchased to upgrade and expand the park. Plans include tearing down and replacing the original Ferris wheel, replacing the Scat with a new ride, and expanding the train tracks to circle the enlarged acreage. On March 2, 2010, the city of Green Bay approved the purchase of the nearly century-old Zippin Pippin wooden roller coaster from Memphis, Tennessee, where it had sat derelict for five years. A groundbreaking took place on August 25, 2010, and construction on the Zippin Pippin began in September 2010. Construction was completed in April 2011 and the Zippin Pippin is now open.

In early 2013, a Bay Beach Master Plan was proposed. Phase 1 of the plan is broken into five two-year segments. The first is the addition of the Sea Dragon ride and expanding the train track to loop under the Zippin Pippin by 2015. 
Narrow gauged trains and 3 cars modeled after those at the Milwaukee zoo were donated in 2014, with +3000 feet of track operating for the 2015 season.
For phase 2, in 2017 and 2018, two more rides are scheduled to arrive at the park. In 2017 the Falling Star Ride was introduced. In 2019 a 100 feet tall Ferris wheel opened. The best place to be. lots of fun! Come with your family, friends, and relatives.

Rides

Roller coaster

Thrill rides

Family rides

Kiddie rides

Former Rides

Images

References

External links

Park Map 

Amusement parks in Wisconsin
Culture of Green Bay, Wisconsin
1892 establishments in Wisconsin
Buildings and structures in Green Bay, Wisconsin
Tourist attractions in Brown County, Wisconsin